Mohd Roslan Sulaiman is a Malaysian academic administrator. He is the Vice-Chancellor of Universiti Putra Malaysia, effective from 1 September 2020. He obtained his degree in Veterinary Medicine from Universiti Pertanian Malaysia in 1994 and doctoral degree in Nervous System Physiology from University of Edinburgh in 1999. As of 2020, he has published more than 200 research results in high-impact journals.

Furloughed from position 
Less than six months after he was appointed as Vice-Chancellor of UPM, the Ministry of Higher Education furloughed him from the position without giving any reason. The furlough period was from 18 February 2021 until 17 March 2021, but has since been extended indefinitely. The ministry also instructed the UPM's Deputy Vice-Chancellor (Research and Innovation) in lieu of Vice-Chancellor's position. Four months after he had been furloughed, he resumed his position as Vice-Chancellor of UPM from 21 June 2021.

Honour

Honour of Malaysia 
  :
  Knight Companion of the Order of Sultan Ahmad Shah of Pahang (DSAP) – Dato' (17 March 2022)
  :
  Knight Commander of the Order of the Crown of Selangor (DPMS) – Dato' (11 December 2022)

References

Vice-chancellors of universities in Malaysia
University of Putra Malaysia alumni
1969 births
Living people
Malaysian veterinarians